Grote Markt  (Dutch for "Grand Market"; French: Grand-Place) is a common name of a centrally located historic market square in many cities in Belgium and the Netherlands.

 Grote Markt (Antwerp)
 Grote Markt (Brussels), also known as the Grand-Place
 Grote Markt (Haarlem)
 Grote Markt (Kortrijk)
 Grote Markt (Leuven)
 Grote Markt RandstadRail station

See also 
 market square
 Markt (Bruges)

Town squares